The Excelsior Mountains are located in western Nevada in the United States. The range stretches in an east-west direction in Mineral County southwest of the town of Mina, Nevada. The mountains reach an elevation of 8,805 feet at Moho Mountain in the southeastern part of the range. The Humboldt-Toiyabe National Forest lies at the western end of the Excelsior Mountains.

References

Nevada Atlas & Gazetteer, DeLorme, 2001, pg. 52, 

Mountain ranges of Nevada
Mountain ranges of Mineral County, Nevada